Alice Veronica Stanton (born 5 December 1960) is an Irish former cricketer. She played for Ireland in three Women's One Day Internationals (ODIs).

She made her Women's ODI debut in 1987, against Australia, and became the first Irish player to be dismissed for a duck in a Women's ODI.

References

External links 
 
 

1960 births
Living people
Irish women cricketers
Cricketers from Dublin (city)